Soroca Fortress is a historic fort in the Republic of Moldova, in the modern-day city of Soroca.

The city has its origin in the medieval Genoese trade post of Olchionia, or Alchona. It is known for its well-preserved stronghold, established by the Moldavian Prince Stephen the Great in 130

The original wooden fort, which defended a ford over the Dniester (Moldovan/Romanian: Nistru), was an important link in the chain of fortifications which comprised four forts (e.g. Akkerman and Khotin) on the Dniester, two forts on the Danube and three forts on the north border of medieval Moldova. Between 1543 and 1546 under the rule of Petru Rareş, the fortress was rebuilt in stone as a perfect circle with five bastions situated at equal distances.

During the Great Turkish War, John Sobieski's forces successfully defended the fortress against the Ottomans. It was of vital military importance during the Pruth Campaign of Peter the Great in 1711. The stronghold was sacked by the Russians in the Russo-Turkish War (1735–1739). The Soroca fortress is an important attraction in Soroca, having preserved cultures and kept the old Soroca in the present day.

Architecture

The current building displays elaborate characteristics of late medieval fortifications. This observation conveys the idea that the fort was perhaps built by experts from Western Europe or Transylvanian people who traveled in Western Europe and brought architectural ideas back to Moldova :
The walls are not built straight but in a curved shape to better resist projectiles, as are the four outer towers.
One can also notice round towers which allowed the defenders to shoot from better angles and thus protect the base of the walls. 
The entire building has a diameter of 30 meters, and 4 meters for each tower. Each tower has 4 levels, of which the first two lower ones were used for artillery. The walls are 3 meters thick and we can find signs of a previous ditch. The main entrance tower had 3 doors, amongst them a portcullis which was closed during battles. The space saved at the upper level allowed the garrison to pray in a small chapel.

Despite all these features the fort was obsolete after the end of the 14th century because of the more widespread use of gunpowder.

See also

 Nicolae Bulat

External links
 Molddata.md: Cetatea Soroca 
 Cetatea Soroca

Gallery

References

Castles in Moldova
Castles in Moldavia
Buildings and structures completed in 1499
History museums in Moldova
Tourist attractions in Moldova
History of Soroca